The third season of Australia's Greatest Athlete was broadcast on the Seven Network and was hosted by Mark Beretta, with last season's competitor Wendell Sailor. Mark Webber and past season winner Billy Slater presented occasional fitness tips and interviews with the competitors in video packages.

Billy Slater, who won the first two seasons of the show, did not defend his title due to recovery from shoulder surgery, but was still involved in the show as a 'Rexona ambassador' alongside Mark Webber, where each also tips a player in each event. This season was filmed at the Novotel Twin Waters Resort on the Sunshine Coast in Queensland.

The season began on 13 February 2011 at 4:30pm for a total of six episodes.

Participants

Shannon Eckstein - Three-time world Ironman champion and runner up of season 2
Mark Winterbottom - V8 Supercar driver
Quade Cooper - Rugby Union player
Luke Hodge - Australian rules football player
Kurt Gidley - Rugby league 4 time defending champion
Eamon Sullivan - Olympic swimmer
Fabrice Lapierre - athletics competitor (long jump)
Ken Wallace - Olympic Kayaking competitor

Episodes

Episode 1
 Mini Ironman Challenge
 Rugby Oz Tag Challenge

Episode 2
 Swimming Challenge
 Bench Press Challenge

Episode 3
 Jet Ski Challenge
 40m Beach Sprint Challenge

Episode 4
 Surf Boat Rowing Challenge
 AFL Kick For Goal Challenge

Episode 5
 Basketball Challenge
 Boxing Challenge

Episode 6
 Final Assault Course

Results table
The following table shows how many points each competitor earned throughout the series.

† indicates this event was the 'sports specific challenge' for this athlete
 The contestant won the challenge
 The contestant came second in the challenge
 The contestant came last in the challenge
 The contestant won the series
 The contestant came second overall in the series
 The contestant came last overall in the series

References

External links
Official Website

Preview of competition - The Roar

2011 Australian television seasons